Claudia Wilbourn (born  circa 1951) is a former professional female bodybuilder from the United States.

One of the leading figures in the early days of women's bodybuilding, Wilbourn began heavy training in 1971.  She competed in the first Women’s World Bodybuilding Championships in June 1979, finishing second to Lisa Lyon.  In 1980 she won the title of Ms. California, then finished second by one point to Laura Combes at the NPC Nationals.  She made one Ms. Olympia appearance, finishing 17th in the 1982 contest.  Wilbourn was inducted into the IFBB Hall of Fame in 2006.

Contest history
1979 Women's World Bodybuilding Championships - 2nd
1979 Robby Robinson Classic - 6th
1980 United States Championship - 3rd
1980 Ms. California - 1st
1980 NPC Nationals - 2nd
1982 IFBB Ms. Olympia - 17th

External links
IFBB Hall of Fame profile

American female bodybuilders
1951 births
Living people
Professional bodybuilders
21st-century American women